Nedić (Cyrillic script: Недић) is a surname. It may refer to:

Ljubomir Nedić (1858–1902), popular Serbian writer, philosopher, and critic
Martin Nedić (1810–1895), Croatian poet
Milan Nedić (1877–1946), Serbian general and politician, chief of the general staff of the Yugoslav Army, and the Prime Minister of the puppet government of National Salvation, in the German occupied territory of Serbia
Milutin Nedić (1882–1945), Yugoslav Armijski đeneral (lieutenant general) and Chief of the General Staff of the Royal Yugoslav Army

Serbian surnames
Matronymic surnames